Sardar Shah Wali Khan (Pashto: سردار شاه ولی خان) (April 16, 1888 – April 1977) also known as Field Marshal Sardar Shah Wali Khan Ghazi was a political and military figure in Afghanistan. He was a member of the Musahiban and uncle of King Mohammad Zahir Shah and President Mohammed Daoud Khan. He was full brother of Prime Minister Sardar Shah Mahmud Khan, King Mohammed Nadir Shah and paternal half-brother of Prime Minister Mohammad Hashim Khan.

He was the father of Prince Lieutenant-General Sardar Abdul Wali Khan, senior cousin and power behind the throne of king Mohammed Zahir Shah during the 1963-1973 constitutional period and throughout their exile.

Career
Commander of Royal Bodyguard in 1906
Commander of Cavalry Corps in 1921
Equerry to King Amanullah Khan  in 1924
Commander-in-chief of the army that defeated Habibullah Kalakani (also known as Bacha-ye Saqqow) and captured Kabul on 10 October 1929, for which he received the titles of Ghazi and Fateh Kabul ("Conqueror of Kabul").
Viceroy to King Nader Shah in 1929
Acting Minister for Defence from 1935 to 1936
Acting Prime Minister from 1936 to 1937
Ambassador to Pakistan from 1948 to 1949.

References 

1888 births
1977 deaths
Pashtun people
Government ministers of Afghanistan
Prime Ministers of Afghanistan
Ambassadors of Afghanistan to Pakistan
Emigrants from British India to Afghanistan